Glenn Thomas Ashby  (born 1 September 1977) is an Australian sailor from Strathfieldsaye, a suburb of Bendigo, Victoria. He is a multiple multihull world champion. He has been part of Team New Zealand as the wing trimmer for the 2013 America's Cup, the skipper of the 2017 America's Cup winners, Emirates Team New Zealand. and the mainsail trimmer for the 2021 America's Cup.

Ashby grew up sailing with his brother and sister at Bendigo Yacht Club. Learning in a Northbridge Junior at around seven, his Dad later took him on a Sabre. In 1996 at 18, Glenn went overseas for the first time in his life. Competing at the A-Class Worlds in Spain against 86 others, he won.

Ashby and skipper Darren Bundock were the 2007 world champions in the Tornado class and ranked number one in the event going into the 2008 Summer Olympics. However, they were beaten by the Spanish team and won silver.

Ashby has won 10 A Class catamaran world championships. He was an Australian Institute of Sport scholarship holder.

In the 2019 New Zealand New Year Honours, Ashby was appointed a Member of the New Zealand Order of Merit, for services to sailing.

References

External links 
 
 
 
 
 Australian Olympic Committee profile
 

1977 births
Living people
Australian male sailors (sport)
Olympic silver medalists for Australia
Sailors at the 2008 Summer Olympics – Tornado
Olympic sailors of Australia
Olympic medalists in sailing
Australian Institute of Sport sailors
Medalists at the 2008 Summer Olympics
Extreme Sailing Series sailors
Team New Zealand sailors
2017 America's Cup sailors
2013 America's Cup sailors
Tornado class world champions
World champions in sailing for Australia
Members of the New Zealand Order of Merit
2021 America's Cup sailors
Sportspeople from Bendigo